

This is a list of township-level divisions of the province of Guizhou, People's Republic of China. After province, prefecture, and county-level divisions, township-level divisions constitute the formal fourth-level administrative divisions of the PRC. This list is divided first into the prefecture-level then the county-level divisions. The six prefecture-level divisions of Guizhou are subdivided into 107 county-level divisions (15 districts, 7 county-level cities, 54 counties, 11 autonomous counties and 1 special district). Those are in turn divided into 1785 township-level divisions (691 towns (镇), 506 townships (乡), 252 ethnic townships (民族乡) and 94 subdistricts(街道)).

Administrative divisions
All of these administrative divisions are explained in greater detail at Administrative divisions of the People's Republic of China. This chart lists only prefecture-level and county-level divisions of Guizhou.

Guiyang (贵阳)

Nanming District (贵阳市)

 Subdistrict (街道)
Shifulu Subdistrict, Zhonghua South Road Subdistrict, Youzhajie Subdistrict, Xinhualu Subdistrict, Ergezhai Subdistrict, Big South Gate Subdistrict, Longdongbao Subdistrict, Hebing Subdistrict, Taiciqiao Subdistrict, Xihulu Subdistrict, Zhongcao Subdistrict, Zunyilu SubdistrictXingguang Subdistrict, Shachong Subdistrict

Township (鄉)
Yunguan, Houchao, Yongyue

Ethnic Minority Township (民族乡)
Xiaobi Buyi Ethnic Minority Township

Yunyan District (云岩区)

 Subdistrict (街道)
Zhonghua Central Road Subdistrict, Zhongshan Eastern Road, Zhongshan Western Road, Zhonghua Northern Road, Beijinglu Subdistrict, Yan'an Central Road Subdistrict, Western City Road Subdistrict, Putuolu Subdistrict, Huaichengbeilu, Guiwulu Subdistrict, Qianlingdong Road Subdistrict, Chengqinglu Subdistrict, Touqiao Subdistrict, Three bridges subdistrict, Zhaijilu, Jinguan Subdistrict, Jinya Subdistrict, Jinhui Subdistrict

Town (镇)
Qianling

Huaxi District (花溪区)

 Subdistrict (街道)
Guizhu, Xibei

Town (镇)
Qingyan, Shiban

Township (鄉)
Dangwu, Jiu'an, Maiping, Yanlou

Other 其他
Qingxishequ

 Miao Ethnic Minority Township (民族乡)
Mengguan Miao Ethnic Minority Township, Huchao, Gaopu, Qiaopao, Maling

Wudang District (乌当区)

 Subdistrict (街道)
Xintian Subdistrict, Gaoxinglu, Jinyang

Town (镇)
Zhuchang, Dongfeng, Shuitian, Yangchang, Jinhua

Township (鄉)
Xiaba, Xinyang, Baiyi

County-Equivalent Region 类似乡级单位
Sanjia Far

 Buyi Ethnic Minority Township (民族乡)
Xinbaopu, Pianpu

Baiyun District (白云区)

 Subdistrict (街道)
Dashanhe, Gongjiazhai, Yanshanhong, Dulaying

Town (镇)
Yanshanhong, Maijia, Shawen

 Buyi Ethnic Minority Township (民族乡)
Dula, Niuyang

Guanshanhu District (观山湖区)

 Subdistrict (街道)
Jinyang Subdistrict

Town (镇)
Jinhua, Zhuchang

Township (鄉)
Baihua

Kaiyang County (开阳县)

Town (镇)
Chengguan, Shuangliu, Jinzhong, Fengsan, Nanmudu, Longyan

Township (鄉)
Nanlong, Yongwen (|永温乡), Zhaiji, Huali, Longshui, Miping, Maoyun

Buyi and Miao Ethnic Minority Township (民族乡)
Hefeng, Nanjiang, Gaozhai

Xifeng County (息烽县)

Town (镇)
Yongqing, Wenyuan, Jiuzhuang, Xiaozhaiba

Township (鄉)
Xishan, Yanglongsi, Shidong, Luwo, Liuchang

Miao Ethnic Minority Township (民族乡)
Qingshan, Xifeng

Xiuwen County (修文县)

Town (镇)
Longyang, Zhazuo, Jiuchang, Liuchang

Township (鄉)
Gupao, Liutun, Xiaoqing, Xiping, Liutong

Ethnic Minority Township (民族乡)
Dashi

Qingzhen City (清镇市)

 Subdistrict (街道)
Qinglong Subdistrict

Town (镇)
Hongfenghu, Zhan, Weicheng, Xindian

Township (鄉)
Baihuahu, Anliu, Liwo

 Buyi and Miao Ethnic Minority Township (民族乡)
Maige, Wangzhuang, Liuchang

Liupanshui (六盘水)

Liuzhi Special District 六枝特区

Town (镇)
Pingzhai, Langdai, Yanjiao, Muyan, Dayong

Township (鄉)
Xinyao, Xinyang, Duoque, Longyang, Xinhua

 Ethnic Minority Township (民族乡)

Labie, Zhexi, Niuyang, Zhongzhai, Qingkou, Sazhi, Maokou, Suojia, Longjiao

Pan County 盘县

Town (镇)

Township (鄉)
Zhongyi, Xinmin, Zhudong, Lianghe, Huashi, Yingwu

 Miao, Yi, and Bai Ethnic Minority Township (民族乡)
Putian, Jichangping, Songhe, Pingdi, Sige, Yuni, Pugu, Jiuying, Yangchang, Baoji, Machang

Shuicheng County 水城县

Town (镇)
Lanba

Township (鄉)
Ajia, Yanjing, Panlong

 Miao, Hui, and Yi Ethnic Minority Township (民族乡)
Dongde, Douqing, Bide, Huale, Nankai, Qinglin, Baohua, Jinpen, Muguo, Faqing, Shuangjia, Yushe Shaomi, Zhichang, Pingzhai, Fa'er, Duge, Jichang, Longchang, Yingpan, Shunchang, Huaga, Changhai, Xinjie, Yezhong, Guobu, Miluo, Houchang, Hongyan

Zhongshan District 钟山区

 Subdistrict (街道)
Huangtudu, Hecheng, Fenghuang, Dewu

Township (鄉)
Laoyingshan, Dahe, Wangjiazhai, Dawan

 Ethnic Minority Township (民族乡)
Yuezhao

Zunyi 遵义

Honghuagang District (红花岗区)

 Subdistrict (街道)
Laochen Subdistrict, Wanli Road Subdistrict, Zhonghua Road subdistrict, Nanmenguan Subdistrict, Yan'an Road subdistrict, Zhoushuiqiao Subdistrict, Central Mountain Road Subdistrict, Beijinglu Subdistrict

Town (镇)
Changzheng, Gangkou, Nanguan, Zhongzhuan, Hailong, Liangxi, Jindingshan, Xinpu

Huichuan District (汇川区)

 Subdistrict (街道)
Shanghailu Subdistrict, Ximalu Subdistrict, Dalianlu Subdistrict

Town (镇)
Gaoqiao, Donggongsi, Tuanze, Gaoping, Panqiao, Sidu

Bozhou District (播州区)

Town (镇)
Nanbai, Longkeng, Sancha, Goujiang, Sanhe, Wujiang, Xiazi, Sanpu, Xinzhou, Yongle, Longping, Laba, Tuanxi, Tiechang, Xiping, Shangji, Maoli, XinMin, Yaxi, Shiban, Yongshan, Fengxiang, Panshui, Mati, Shawan, Songlin, Maoshi, Shanshen, Zhima

 Ethnic Minority Township (民族乡)
Pingzheng, Hongguan

Tongzi County (桐梓县)

Town (镇)

Suiyang County (绥阳县)

Zheng'an County (正安县)

Daozhen County (道真仡佬族 苗族自治县)

 Subdistrict (街道)
 Yinzhen Subdistrict

Town (镇)
 Yuxi, Sanjiang, Longxing, Jiucheng, Zhongxin, Luolong, Yangxi, Sanqiao, Daqian, Pingmu, Hekou,

Township (鄉)
 Zongping Township, Taoyuan Township

 Ethnic Minority Township (民族乡)
 Shangba Tujia Ethnic Township

Wuchuan County (务川仡佬族  苗族自治县)

Fenggang County (凤冈县)

Town (镇)

Township (鄉)

Meitan County (湄潭县)

Town (镇)

Township (鄉)

Yuqing County (余庆县)

Xishui County (习水县)

Chishui City (赤水市)

Renhuai City (仁怀市)

Town (镇)

Township (鄉)

References

 
Guizhou
Townships